Keihin may refer to:

 Keihin region, Japan
 Keihin Corporation, a brand of motorcycle and powersports carburetor, common on Japanese and other motorcycles, including Harley-Davidson
 Keihin-Tōhoku Line, a railway line in Japan
 Keihin Ferry Boat, a ship operating company in Yokohama
 Keihin Kyuko, a private railroad in Japan
 Keihin Ports, the joint management organization for the ports of Kawasaki and Yokohama